Verweij or Verwey is a Dutch toponymic surname. It is a contraction of "van der Weij" (modern Dutch: van de weide), meaning "from the meadow". Notable people with the surname include:

Verweij
Ben Verweij (1895–1951), Dutch footballer
Bull Verweij (1909–2010), Dutch businessman
Geoffrey Verweij (born 1982), Dutch footballer
Johan Verweij (born 1950s), New Zealand footballer
Koen Verweij (born 1990), Dutch speed skater
 (born 1964), Dutch classical scholar and historian
Verwey
Albert Verwey (1865–1937), Dutch poet
Alvaro Verwey (born 1999), Surinamese football forward
Bobby Verwey (born 1941), South African golfer
Evert Verwey (1905-1981), Dutch physical chemist
Jacques Verwey (born 1989), South African rugby player
John Verwey (born 1957), Canadian darts player
Kees Verwey (1900–1995), Dutch painter 
Roland Verwey (born 1981), German ice hockey player
Tobias Verwey (born 1981), Namibian cricketer

See also
Verwey transition, a mineral phase transition named after Evert Verwey
Deryagin-Landau and Verwey-Overbeck theory, a colloidal chemistry theory named for Evert Verwey 
Jordaan v Verwey, a South African contract case law

References

Dutch-language surnames
Dutch toponymic surnames